Saeed Al Maktoum may refer to any person with Saeed given name in Al Maktoum family, the royal house of Dubai:
Saeed bin Maktoum bin Hasher Al Maktoum (1878–1958), ruler of Dubai as Saeed II
Saeed bin Maktoum bin Rashid Al Maktoum, (born 1976) participate at 2004 Summer Olympics Shooting, Saeed II great-grand son